Toohey may refer to:

Toohey (surname)
Tooheys, Australian brewery
Toohey Mountain, mountain in Australia